Army general is the highest military rank of Vietnam also it the highest rank in the People's Army of Vietnam

According to current regulations, according to Article 88 of the 2013 Constitution of Vietnam, the rank of General of the Vietnam People's Army is decided by the President, who is also the Chairman of the National Defense and Security Council.

The rank of General is conferred only on senior officers holding the following positions: Minister of National Defense, Chief of the General Staff and Chairman of the General Department of Politics. Exceptions include:

 Hoàng Văn Thái was promoted in 1980 while serving as Deputy Minister of National Defense and Deputy Chief of the General Staff, although he was the first Chief of the General Staff from 1945–1954 and acted briefly as Chief of the General Staff in 1954 and 1974).
 Lê Đức Anh in 1984 when he was Deputy Minister of Defense cum commander of Vietnamese volunteer troops in Cambodia.

As of July 12, 2021, the Vietnam People's Army has 16 servicemen conferred the rank of General.

There were two soldiers who were directly promoted to the rank of General without intermediaries: Võ Nguyên Giáp (1948) and Nguyễn Chí Thanh (1959).

Currently, there are 2 Army Generals holding military ranks currently working, namely Phan Van Giang, Minister of National Defense; Lương Cường, Director of the General Department of Politics of the Vietnam People's Army.

Rank insignia 

According to Decree No. 33 of March 22, 1946 signed by the President of the Government of the Democratic Republic of Vietnam, the rank of General of the National Army of Vietnam was first regulated with the rank of 3 gold stars on the shoulder. red background. However, at that time, no soldier had been awarded this rank. It was not until January 20, 1948, that Commander-in-Chief of the National Army and militia and self-defense militia Võ Nguyên Giáp was the first to be conferred this rank.

The rank of General was again redefined with the Law on Service Regulations of Officers of the Vietnam People's Army dated May 31, 1958. And Decree 307-TTg dated June 20, 1958 also stipulates that the rank of General carries 4 gold stars above the rank. And on August 31, 1959, Chairman of the General Department of Politics Nguyễn Chí Thanh was the second person to be conferred the rank of General.

List of Vietnam army generals

See also 

 Vietnamese military ranks and insignia

References 

Four-star officers
Lists of Russian and Soviet military personnel
People's Army of Vietnam